Ugochi Emenayo (born 20 December 1997) is a Nigerian professional footballer who plays for Nasarawa Amazons  and the Nigeria women's national football team.

Career
Ugochi has represented Nigeria at under-17, under-21 and senior national team.

International career
Ugochi  alongside 24 other players were selected by head coach, Bala Nkiyu to represent the Nigeria U-17 team at the 2014 FIFA U-17 Women's World Cup in Costa Rica.

She didn't make the squad list for Nigeria in the 2018 Africa Women Cup of Nations.

In April 2019, Ugochi alongside Rofiat Sule, Osarenoma Igbinovia and 23 other players were selected by head coach, Thomas Dennerby to represent Nigeria at the West African Football Union Women's Cup in Abidjan.

She was among the players picked to represent Nigeria in the 2020 African Women's Olympic Games.

References

External links
 

1997 births
Living people
Nigerian women's footballers
Nasarawa Amazons F.C. players
Women's association footballers not categorized by position